Raymond Melvin Murphy (December 13, 1927 – March 2020) was an American politician from the state of Michigan. He served in the Michigan House of Representatives from 1983 to 1998 and Michigan Senate from 1999 to 2002.

Murphy was the last surviving delegate to Michigan's 1961 constitutional convention to have also served in the Michigan Legislature.

Murphy died in March 2020, aged 92.

References

1927 births
Democratic Party members of the Michigan House of Representatives
Democratic Party Michigan state senators
Detroit Institute of Technology
Wayne State University alumni
American real estate brokers
Politicians from St. Louis
2020 deaths